New Life is an album by David Murray released on the Italian Black Saint label in 1985 and is a recording of Murray's Octet. It features performances by Murray, Baikida Carroll, Hugh Ragin, Craig Harris, John Purcell, Adegoke Steve Colson, Wilber Morris and Ralph Peterson, Jr.

Reception
The Allmusic review by Scott Yanow awarded the album 4 stars, stating: "The tunes ('Train Whistle,' "'Morning Song,' 'New Life' and 'Blues in the Pocket') are each fairly memorable – the themes are strong than usual – and as usual, the Octet features the right combination of adventurous solos and colorful writing. Recommended."

Track listing
 "Train Whistle" – 11:49  
 "Morning Song" – 10:09  
 "New Life" – 6:35  
 "Blues in the Pocket" – 11:14  
 
All compositions by David Murray
Recorded at Sorcerer Sound Studio, NYC, October 8, 1985

Personnel
David Murray – tenor saxophone, bass clarinet
Baikida Carroll – trumpet
Hugh Ragin – trumpet
Craig Harris – trombone
John Purcell – alto saxophone
Steve Colson – piano
Wilber Morris – bass
Ralph Peterson, Jr. – drums

References 

1985 albums
David Murray (saxophonist) albums
Black Saint/Soul Note albums